Lypusa is a genus of moths of the Lypusidae family, traditionally held to be a monotypic lineage of Tineoidea. However, it may actually belong to the same lineage of Gelechioidea as the Amphisbatinae (or Amphisbatidae).

The genus contains only 2 known species:
 Lypusa maurella
 Lypusa tokari

References

Gelechioidea
Tineoidea
Moth genera